Anderson Paim Rodrigues or simply Anderson Rodrigues (born November 7, 1982), is a Brazilian left back. He currently plays for Guarany on loan from Cruzeiro.

Contract
Guarany (Loan) 9 January 2008 to 5 May 2008
Cruzeiro 1 December 2005 to 30 November 2008

External links
 placar
 CBF

1982 births
Living people
Brazilian footballers
Sociedade Esportiva e Recreativa Caxias do Sul players
Ipatinga Futebol Clube players
Cruzeiro Esporte Clube players
Villa Nova Atlético Clube players
Esporte Clube Vitória players
Guarany Futebol Clube players
Association football defenders
People from Bagé
Sportspeople from Rio Grande do Sul